The 2020–21 season was Ipswich Town's 143rd year in existence. Along with competing in EFL League One, the club also participated in the FA Cup, EFL Cup and EFL Trophy. The season covers the period from 1 July 2020 to 30 June 2021.

Kits
Supplier: Adidas / Sponsor: Carers Trust (chest), Thank You NHS (back), Mortgagemove (shorts)

First-team squad
Age listed below are accurate as of 10 May 2021

First-team coaching staff
Until 28 February:

From 2 March:

Pre-season

Competitions

EFL League One

League table

Results summary

Results by round

Matches
The 2020–21 season fixtures were released on 21 August.

FA Cup

The draw for the first round of the FA Cup took place on 26 October.

EFL Cup

The first round draw was made on 18 August, live on Sky Sports, by Paul Merson. The draw for both the second and third round were confirmed on September 6, live on Sky Sports by Phil Babb.

EFL Trophy

The regional group stage draw was confirmed on 18 August.

Group stage

Transfers

Transfers in

Loans in

Transfers out

Loans out

New contracts

Squad statistics
All statistics updated as of end of season

Appearances and goals

|-
! colspan=14 style=background:#dcdcdc; text-align:center| Goalkeepers

|-
! colspan=14 style=background:#dcdcdc; text-align:center| Defenders

|-
! colspan=14 style=background:#dcdcdc; text-align:center| Midfielders

|-
! colspan=14 style=background:#dcdcdc; text-align:center| Forwards

|-
! colspan=14 style=background:#dcdcdc; text-align:center| Players transferred out during the season

|-

Goalscorers

Assists

Clean sheets

Disciplinary record

Captains

Awards

Player awards

Greene King Player of the Month
Ipswich Town official player of the month award.

EFL League One Manager of the Month

References

Ipswich Town
Ipswich Town F.C. seasons